Victor K. Bellamy (born June 2, 1963) is a former American football defensive back who played one season with the Philadelphia Eagles of the National Football League. He played college football at Syracuse University and attended Central High School in Philadelphia, Pennsylvania.

References

External links
Just Sports Stats

Living people
1963 births
Players of American football from Philadelphia
American football defensive backs
African-American players of American football
Syracuse Orange football players
Philadelphia Eagles players
21st-century African-American people
20th-century African-American sportspeople